Dmitri Stepanovich Andreyev (born 26 September 1980) is a former Russian professional footballer who played as centre-back.

Club career
He made his debut in the Russian Premier League in 2000 for FC Uralan Elista.

Honours
 Russian Second Division, Zone Ural-Povolzhye best defender: 2010.

References

1980 births
People from Elista
Living people
Russian footballers
Association football defenders
FC Elista players
FC Zhemchuzhina Sochi players
FC Lada-Tolyatti players
Russian Premier League players
FC Tyumen players
FC Volga Nizhny Novgorod players
FC Arsenal Tula players
FC Orenburg players
Sportspeople from Kalmykia